The elections for the tenth Majlis were held in the spring of 1935.

People of Greater Tunb were invited to vote in the elections as part of the Bandar Abbas constituency.

References

Iran
Legislative
National Consultative Assembly elections
Electoral fraud in Iran